Rairua-Mahanatoa is an associated commune on the island of Raivavae, in French Polynesia. According to the 2017 census, it had a population of 468 people.

There are three villages: Rairua, the administrative center of Raivavae, Mahanatoa, and Matutea.

References

Geography of the Austral Islands
Populated places in French Polynesia